Chittemma Mogudu is a 1993 Indian Telugu-language film directed by A. Kodandarami Reddy. It stars Mohan Babu, Divya Bharati, Pooja Bedi (her Telugu debut) and Jaggayya. The film was a remake of the Tamil film Thalattu Ketkuthamma. It was not commercially successful.

Plot
The young village girl Chitti (Divya Bharti) is a bubbly and fun-loving girl. She's enjoying life with her young group of friends, consisting of three younger boys. One day, while playing one of her pranks, an old man curses her. On top of that, she witnesses a pregnant woman falling at night and suffering immense pain before ultimately dying. This incident causes Chitti's fear of pregnancy. However, the young man Sai Krishna (Mohan Babu) visits the village and befriends Chitti. Soon after that, her parents arrange the marriage between Chitti and Mohan Babu. Both are more than happy with this arrangement. After the wedding, however, Chitti doesn't want to consummate the marriage out of fear of pregnancy. Mohan Babu is unhappy about it and soon gets attracted to a young doctor (Pooja Bedi). Dreaming of spending nights with her, Mohan Babu gets drunk and soon after goes home and rapes Chitti. The next morning, upon getting sober, Mohan Babu tries to comfort the outraged Chitti, while the latter tries to leave for her home village to go back to her parents. Mohan Babu tries to win her back, but fails time after time. Soon, Chitti has to realise that she got pregnant that night while her doctor turns out to be the woman her husband got crazy for.

Cast  
Mohan Babu as Sai Krishna
Divya Bharati as Chittemma aka Chitti
Pooja Bedi as Dr. Pushpalatha
Jaggayya as Chitti's father
Brahmanandam as Puliraju 
Kota Srinivasa Rao as Military Babai

Music 
Music for this film was composed by K.V Mahadevan.

"Halo Halo Lady doctor" - Mano , K. S. Chithra
"Chittemmo Pottemmo "- S. P. Balasubrahmanyam, K.S Chithra
"Chinuku Ralithe " - K.J Yesudas , K.S Chithra
"Boddulo Rupayibilla"- Mano, K.S Chithra
"Namala Swamiki" - S.P Balu, K.S Chithra
"Nindu Kundala". - K.J Yesudas

Awards 
Divya Bharti won Nandi Special Jury Award for her performance in this film.

References

1992 films
1990s Telugu-language films
Films directed by A. Kodandarami Reddy
Telugu remakes of Tamil films
Films scored by K. V. Mahadevan